= 1954 Dominican general election =

Election in Dominica

General elections were held in Dominica on 19 August 1954. No political parties contested the elections and all candidates ran as independents. Voter turnout was 70.3%.

== Results ==
Party	Votes	%	Seats	+/–
Independents	15,749	100.00	8	0
Total	15,749	100.00	8	0
Valid votes	15,749	94.05		
Invalid/blank votes	997	5.95		
Total votes	16,746	100.00		
Registered voters/turnout	23,835	70.26		
Source: Nohlen
